RJB may refer to:
 Radio Bernese Jura
 Rajbiraj Airport, Nepal, IATA airport code
 Ring junger Bünde
 rj basket schools edit by ew